This is a list of deputies of the 16th National Assembly of France. They were elected in the 2022 French legislative election.

Parliamentary groups

List

Vacancies

References

See also 
 Candidates in the 2022 French legislative election
 Election results of Cabinet Ministers during the 2022 French legislative election
 Results of the 2022 French legislative election by constituency
 List of deputies of the 15th National Assembly of France
Lists of members of the National Assembly (France)
2020s in French politics
Legislatures of the National Assembly (France)
2022 French legislative election
France